Sergio Gonella (23 May 1933 – 19 June 2018) was an Italian bank manager and association football referee.
He was the first ever Italian appointed to referee the final of the FIFA World Cup which occurred when he took charge of the 1978 final between hosts Argentina and the Netherlands.
He is one of only two persons (the other being the Swiss Gottfried Dienst) to have refereed the finals of both the UEFA European Championship and the FIFA World Cup.
In 2013, he was inducted into the Italian Football Hall of Fame.

Referee career 
Gonella's professional career began in 1965 when he debuted in the Italian Serie A, earning an early reputation as being very strict and impartial, after awarding 7 penalties in the first 7 games of the 1965–1966 season. In 1972, he was promoted to UEFA and received the important Mauro Award in Italy. In 1974 refereed the Italian Cup final between Bologna and Palermo. In 1975, he refereed the Super Cup final match. At international level, he refereed in the 1976 European Championship final between Czechoslovakia and West Germany. He also later refereed in the 1978 FIFA World Cup, after which he retired, having refereed 175 matches in Serie A. From 1998 to 2000 he was also president of the Italian Referee Association (AIA) and member of the UEFA Arbitration Commission between 1998 and 2000.

Gonella garnered media attention when he delayed the start of the 1978 World Cup final. This occurred when the Argentinians protested an arm bandage worn by Dutch right winger René van de Kerkhof. The Dutch team argued that the bandage was passed by FIFA and had already been worn by Van de Kerkhof during earlier matches in the tournament, and they threatened to walk off the field. Finally an extra layer of padding was applied to the bandage as a solution, and the match was started.

References 

Sergio Gonella

1933 births
2018 deaths
Italian football referees
FIFA World Cup Final match officials
1978 FIFA World Cup referees
People from Asti
UEFA Euro 1976 referees
UEFA European Championship final referees
Sportspeople from the Province of Asti